Gholam Hossein Sarmadnia (1949 - October 12, 1994) was an Iranian researcher who served as assistant professor in the Department of Agriculture at the Isfahan University of Technology. He was awarded for his translation of the book Physiological Aspects of Dryland Farming at Iran's Book of the Year Awards in 1987.

Death 
Sarmadnia was killed in the crash of Iran Aseman Airlines Flight 746.

References 

1949 births
1994 deaths
Iranian translators
University of Arizona alumni
Iran's Book of the Year Awards recipients
Victims of aviation accidents or incidents in Iran
Victims of aviation accidents or incidents in 1994